Phyllonorycter loxozona is a moth of the family Gracillariidae. It is known from South Africa and Uganda. The record for Kenya is a misidentification of Cameraria torridella.

The length of the forewings is 2.8–3.2 mm. The forewings are elongate and the ground colour is ochreous brown with white markings. The hindwings are fuscous with a long shiny fringe of the same colour as the hindwing. Adults are on wing from early February to mid-May and from early October to mid-December.

The larvae feed on Dombeya bagshawei, Dombeya emarginata and Dombeya rotundifolia. They mine the leaves of their host plant. The mine has the form of a long, narrow gallery, mainly along the edge of the leaf. Later the larvae form a gall-like swelling near the base of the disc.

References

Moths described in 1936
loxozona
Moths of Africa